is a train station on the JR West Onoda Line in San'yō-Onoda, Yamaguchi Prefecture, Japan. It is the diverging point between the main and branch lines.

Station layout
The unattended station consists of two side platform serving two tracks in a Y shaped configuration. The station building is located in between the platforms.

Platforms

History
The station opened on 16 May 1929.

References

External links

  

Railway stations in Yamaguchi Prefecture